is a song by Japanese singer-songwriter Hikaru Utada, serving as their 17th Japanese single and 24th single overall (including English releases). The single was released on November 22, 2006, following the release of their previous studio album, Ultra Blue (2006). It came two months after the conclusion of Utada's United 2006 tour.

Background and release 
"Boku wa Kuma" was Utada's first try at writing a children's song. On October 1, 2006, it aired on the children's music program Minna no Uta on radio, and on TV the day after. Due to strong demand, the song had been planned for continuous rebroadcasting from  October 2006 to January 2007 on Minna no Uta.

"Boku wa Kuma" was Utada's first single release to have three different pressings: a limited edition that included a picture book, a standard single and cover, and a CD+DVD combo pack, which included the music video.

The song is about a bear, what he can and cannot do, and what he is not (such as a car, chocolate, etc.).  His rival is a fried shrimp.

Utada owns a stuffed bear named Kuma-chan; "kuma" is "bear" in Japanese, and "-chan" is an affectionate suffix added to names. Utada often post photos of him on their U3 blog. After discovering the "made in China" tag on Kuma-chan's bottom, he was given the full name of "Kuma Chang" (pronounced identically to "Kuma-chan" in Japanese). A staff pass was issued to him for the "Utada United 2006." tour.

In June 2006, Utada confessed on their blog that they have "pillow dependence". They call their pillow "makura-san" (Mr. Pillow). They enjoy the comfort of feeling the pillow against their face, and would even hold the pillow all day long when they're stressed out. They were later surprised to find out there are many "pillow-addicts" out there, and joked about setting up a "pillow club". 'Makura-san' and Kuma are apparently good friends.

Utada performed an impromptu performance of "Boku wa Kuma" at the Boston show of their 2010 tour, Utada: In The Flesh 2010.

The song was performed during Utada's two date concert series Wild Life in December 2010.

Track listing
Japanese single
 "Boku wa Kuma" (ぼくはくま) – 2:23
 "Boku wa Kuma" (Original Karaoke) – 2:25

Chart rankings

Certifications and sales

References

2006 singles
Hikaru Utada songs
Songs written by Hikaru Utada
Japanese children's songs
Novelty songs
Fictional bears
Songs about bears
Minna no Uta